A baldresca is an architectural element supporting a loggia. The element is of the medieval tradition and looks like a shelf with a supporting function. A baldresca has no columns.

Examples
A notable example of the use of baldrescas is in the Casa Romei (a 15th-century building located in Ferrara, known precisely for a peculiar mixture of medieval and Renaissance elements), where they support the east loggia.

Gallery

See also
Gallery
Loggia
Overhang
Peristyle

References

Architectural elements
Italian words and phrases